The Pioneer Venus Multiprobe, also known as Pioneer Venus 2 or Pioneer 13, was a spacecraft launched in 1978 to explore Venus as part of NASA's Pioneer program. This part of the mission included a spacecraft bus which was launched from Earth carrying one large and three smaller probes, which after separating penetrated the Venusian atmosphere at a different location, returning data as they descended into the planet's thick atmosphere. The entry occurred on December 9, 1978.

In context
There was also an orbiter launched in 1978, part of the overall Pioneer Venus project along with this entry probe mission. Whereas the probes entered the atmosphere in 1978, the Pioneer Venus Orbiter would stay in orbit throughout the 1980s and the early 1990s. The next major mission was the Magellan spacecraft, which was an orbiter capable of mapping Venus by seeing through its opaque clouds with radar.

Spacecraft 

The Pioneer Venus Multiprobe bus was constructed by the Hughes Aircraft Company, built around the HS-507 bus. Unlike the probes, which did not begin making direct measurements until they had decelerated lower in the atmosphere, the bus returned data on Venus' upper atmosphere.

The bus was targeted to enter the Venusian atmosphere at a shallow entry angle and transmit data until destruction by the heat of atmospheric friction. The objective was to study the structure and composition of the atmosphere down to the surface, the nature and composition of the clouds, the radiation field and energy exchange in the lower atmosphere, and local information on atmospheric circulation patterns. With no heat shield or parachute, the bus made upper atmospheric measurements with two instruments:

 BIMS – an ion mass spectrometer to determine the origin and long-term development of the Venusian atmosphere, the dynamics of the upper atmosphere layers, its energy balance and the effect of solar radiation and interplanetary space on those layers.
 BNMS – a neutral mass spectrometer. This made measurements of the interaction between the solar wind and Venus, the photochemistry of the upper layers of and heat distribution in the Venusian atmosphere.

The spacecraft operated down to an altitude of about  before disintegrating.

Probes 
The spacecraft carried one large and three small atmospheric probes, designed to collect data as they descended into the atmosphere of Venus. The probes did not carry photographic instruments, and were not designed to survive landing – the smaller probes were not equipped with parachutes, and the larger probe's parachute was expected to detach as it neared the ground. All four probes continued transmitting data until impact; however, one survived and continued to transmit data from the surface.

Large probe 

The large probe carried seven experiments, contained within a sealed spherical pressure vessel. The science experiments were:
 LNMS – neutral mass spectrometer to measure the atmospheric composition
 LGC – gas chromatograph to measure the atmospheric composition
 LSFR – solar flux radiometer to measure solar flux penetration in the atmosphere
 LIR – infrared radiometer to measure distribution of infrared radiation
 LCPS – cloud particle size spectrometer to measure particle size and shape
 LN – nephelometer to search for cloud particles
 temperature, pressure, and acceleration sensors

This pressure vessel was encased in a nose cone and aft protective cover. After deceleration from initial atmospheric entry at about  near the equator on the night side of Venus, a parachute was deployed at  altitude.

Small probes 

These probes consisted of spherical pressure vessels surrounded by an aeroshell, but unlike the large probe, they had no parachutes and the aeroshells did not separate from the probes.

The science experiments were:
 a neutral mass spectrometer to measure the atmospheric composition
 a gas chromatograph to measure the atmospheric composition
 SNFR – solar flux radiometer to measure solar flux penetration in the atmosphere
 an infrared radiometer to measure distribution of infrared radiation
 MTUR – cloud particle size spectrometer to measure particle size and shape
 SN – nephelometer to search for cloud particles
 SAS – temperature, pressure, and acceleration sensors

The radio signals from all four probes were also used to characterize the winds, turbulence, and propagation in the atmosphere. The small probes were each targeted at different parts of the planet and were named accordingly.
 The North probe entered the atmosphere at about 60 degrees north latitude on the day side.
 The Night probe entered on the night side.
 The Day probe entered well into the day side, and was the only one of the four probes which continued to send radio signals back after impact, for over an hour.

Launch 
The Pioneer Venus Multiprobe was launched by an Atlas SLV-3D Centaur-D1AR rocket, which flew from Launch Complex 36A at the Cape Canaveral Air Force Station. The launch occurred at 07:33 on August 8, 1978, and deployed the Multiprobe into heliocentric orbit for its coast to Venus.

Arrival at Venus 
Prior to the Multiprobe reaching Venus, the four probes were deployed from the main bus. The large probe was released on November 16, 1978, and the three small probes on November 20.

All four probes and the bus reached Venus on December 9, 1978. The large probe was the first to enter the atmosphere, at 18:45:32 UTC, followed over the next 11 minutes by the other three probes.

The four probes transmitted data until they impacted the surface of Venus. The Day Probe survived the impact, returning data from the surface for 67 minutes and 37 seconds after reaching the surface.

Scientific results 

Below the altitude of  the temperatures measured by the four probes are identical to within a few degrees. Nephelometers identified three cloud layers with different characteristics. The most remarkable discovery was that the ratio of 36argon / 40argon isotopes was much higher than in the Earth's atmosphere, which seems to indicate that the genesis of the Venusian atmosphere is very different from that of Earth. Overall data from airborne sensors confirmed, while specifying the data obtained by the Soviet space probe Venera program that preceded this mission.

Trajectory
Diagram of the PVM's path to planet Venus from Earth in 1978, and this also notes the launch of the Pioneer Venus Orbiter which took place that year also.

Graphic overview

See also 

 Pioneer Venus Orbiter
 List of missions to Venus
 Timeline of artificial satellites and space probes
 Galileo Probe (Jupiter atmospheric probe delivered by Galileo spacecraft)
List of spacecraft powered by non-rechargeable batteries

References

External links 

 NASA: Pioneer Venus Project Information
 Pioneer Venus Program Page by NASA's Solar System Exploration
 NSSDC Master Catalog: Spacecraft Pioneer Venus Probe Bus. (Other components of the mission have their own pages at this site too.)

Articles in Science Magazine issue 4401 (1979) 

 
 
 
 
 
 
 
 
 
 
 
 
 
 
 
 
 
 
 
 
 
 
 
 
 
 
 
 
 
 
 
 
 
 
 
 
 
 
 
 
 
 
 
 
 
 
 
 
 
 
 
 
 
 
 
 
 
 
 
 

Missions to Venus
Pioneer program
1978 in spaceflight
Spacecraft launched in 1978
Extraterrestrial atmosphere entry
Extraterrestrial aircraft